Cujo is a 1981 novel by Stephen King.

Cujo may also refer to:

 Cujo (film), a 1983 film based on the novel
 CUJO, the Cambridge University Jazz Orchestra
 Willie Wolfe, nicknamed Cujo (1951–1974), member of the Symbionese Liberation Army
 Moondog Cujo (1960–2009), American professional wrestler
 Curtis Joseph, nicknamed "Cujo" (born 1967), Canadian hockey coach and former player
 Cujo, or Amon Tobin (born 1972), Brazilian musician

See also 
 Kujō (disambiguation)